Ferron is a city in western Emery County, Utah, United States. The population was 1,461 at the 2020 census.

Settlement

Ferron was originally populated by Mormon settlers in 1877. Three families responded to a call from the LDS Church asking to settle in the Castle Valley. They started on 15 November 1877 and arrived about 21 days later. The group spent time creating dugouts and later made their living in farming.
Although settled in late 1877, the town received its name sometime in the late 1860s to early 1870s when a government surveyor was sent under the homestead act to survey the area. The surveyor's name was Augustus D Ferron, and, as the tale goes, they agreed to name the creek they camped by Ferron's Creek if he would agree to a "dunking" in the creek. He did so, and the creek was then known as Ferron's Creek. Later, when the town was settled, the "s" was dropped from the name, and the creek and town became known as "Ferron".

Geography
Ferron is in western Emery County, along Utah State Route 10, which leads northeast  to Castle Dale, the county seat, and southwest  to Emery.

Demographics

As of the census of 2000, there were 1,623 people, 512 households, and 415 families residing in the city. The population density was 728.8 people per square mile (281.0/km2). There were 585 housing units at an average density of 262.7 per square mile (101.3/km2). The racial makeup of the city was 97.78% White, 0.25% African American, 0.31% Native American, 0.31% Asian, 0.43% from other races, and 0.92% from two or more races. Hispanic or Latino of any race were 1.60% of the population.

There were 512 households, out of which 47.3% had children under the age of 18 living with them, 70.1% were married couples living together, 7.6% had a female householder with no husband present, and 18.9% were non-families. 17.8% of all households were made up of individuals, and 7.6% had someone living alone who was 65 years of age or older. The average household size was 3.06, and the average family size was 3.50.

In the city of Ferron, the population was spread out, with 35.6% under 18, 7.6% from 18 to 24, 22.7% from 25 to 44, 22.2% from 45 to 64, and 11.9% who were 65 years of age or older. The median age was 33 years. For every 100 females, there were 99.4 males. For every 100 females aged 18 and over, there were 91.7 males.

The median income for a household in the city was $38,625, and the median income for a family was $44,688. Males had a median income of $42,400 versus $21,458 for females. The per capita income for the city was $15,034. About 8.9% of families and 13.1% of the population were below the poverty line, including 16.8% of those under age 18 and 3.5% of those aged 65 or over.

Climate 
 04/20/1897 to 06/10/2016

See also

 List of cities and towns in Utah

References

External links

 

Cities in Utah
Cities in Emery County, Utah
Populated places established in 1877
1877 establishments in Utah Territory